The 2016–17 Idaho State Bengals women's basketball team represented Idaho State University during the 2016–17 NCAA Division I women's basketball season. The Bengals, led by ninth year head coach Seton Sobolewski, played their home games at Reed Gym. They were members of the Big Sky Conference. They finished the season 19–14, 10–8 in Big Sky play to finish in a tie for sixth place. They advanced to the championship game of the Big Sky women's tournament where they lost to their in-state rival Idaho. Despite having 19 wins, they were not invited to a postseason tournament.

Roster

Schedule

|-
!colspan=9 style="background:#000000; color:#FF8300;"| Exhibition

|-
!colspan=9 style="background:#000000; color:#FF8300;"| Non-conference regular season

|-
!colspan=9 style="background:#000000; color:#FF8300;"| Big Sky regular season

|-
!colspan=9 style="background:#000000; color:#FF8300;"| Big Sky Women's Tournament

See also
 2016–17 Idaho State Bengals men's basketball team

References

Idaho State Bengals women's basketball seasons
Idaho State